The following article presents a summary of the 1926 football (soccer) season in Brazil, which was the 25th season of competitive football in the country.

Campeonato Paulista

In 1926 there were two different editions of the Campeonato Paulista. One was organized by the Associação Paulista de Esportes Atléticos (APEA) while the other one was organized by the Liga de Amadores de Futebol (LAF).

APEA's Campeonato Paulista

Final Standings

Palestra Itália-SP declared as the APEA's Campeonato Paulista champions.

LAF's Campeonato Paulista

Final Standings

Paulistano declared as the LAF's Campeonato Paulista champions.

State championship champions

Other competition champions

Brazil national team
The Brazil national football team did not play any matches in 1926.

References

 Brazilian competitions at RSSSF
 1923-1932 Brazil national team matches at RSSSF

 
Seasons in Brazilian football
Brazil